Samuel Kerns McConnell Jr. (April 6, 1901 – April 11, 1985) was a Republican member of the U.S. House of Representatives from Pennsylvania.

Biography
Samuel Kerns McConnell Jr. was born in Eddystone, Pennsylvania.  He graduated from the University of Pennsylvania at Philadelphia in 1923.  He was engaged in the investment banking business in 1926, and was a member of the board of trustees of the Norristown State Hospital, 1939–1944, serving as president, 1940-1944.  He served as township commissioner of Lower Merion Township, Pennsylvania, from 1941 to 1944.

McConnell was elected as a Republican to the 78th Congress to fill the vacancy caused by the death of J. William Ditter.  He was re-elected to the 79th Congress and to the six succeeding Congresses.  He served as chairman of the United States House Committee on Education and Labor during the 83rd Congress. McConnell voted present on the Civil Rights Act of 1957. He resigned on September 1, 1957, to become the executive director of United Cerebral Palsy Associations, Inc., serving until June 1961.  He served as vice president and president of Woodcock, Moyer, Fricke and French, Inc. from 1961 to 1967. He died in 1985 in Bryn Mawr, Pennsylvania five days after his 84th birthday. He was interred at West Laurel Hill Cemetery in Bala Cynwyd, Pennsylvania.

References

Sources

1901 births
1985 deaths
People from Eddystone, Pennsylvania
University of Pennsylvania alumni
Burials at West Laurel Hill Cemetery
Republican Party members of the United States House of Representatives from Pennsylvania
20th-century American politicians